Summer Snow (also known as Woman, Forty) is a 1995 Hong Kong comedy-drama film directed by Ann Hui.  It stars Josephine Siao and Roy Chiao in leading roles. The film was selected as the Hong Kong entry for the Best Foreign Language Film at the 68th Academy Awards, but was not accepted as a nominee.

Overview 
The film's Chinese title  literally translates to Woman, 40. Its alternative titles are Loey Yen Sei Seup, or Nuiyan, Seisap.

Plot
Summer Snow tells the story of the relationship between a widower with Alzheimer's disease and his daughter-in-law, May Sun, who is a housewife in her forties trying cope with the upheavals in her family.  Her supportive mother-in-law has just died and her husband, who is a driving test examiner, is not giving her support.

Cast
Josephine Siao as May Sun
Roy Chiao as Lin Sun
Law Kar-ying as Bing Sun
Sin-hung Tam as Ying Sun (Bing's Mother)
Allen Ting as Allen Sun
Koon-Lan Law as Lan Sun
Ha Ping as Mrs. Han
Shun Lau as Mr. Lo
Patricia Ching Yee Chong as Carrie Chin (Daughter-In-Law)
Gin Tsang as Janice
Ann Hui as Neighbour
Fai Chow as Bing's Brother
Stephen Fung as Cannon

Awards
In 1995, Summer Snow won four Golden Horse Awards at the Golden Horse Film Festival and the Prize of the Ecumenical Jury and Silver Berlin Bear at the 45th Berlin International Film Festival. Josephine Siao also won the Silver Bear for Best Actress at Berlin. The following year it won the Grand Prix at the Créteil International Women's Film Festival, several Golden Bauhinia Awards, several Hong Kong Film Awards and the Hong Kong Film Critics Society Awards for Best Actress and Best Film.

1st Golden Bauhinia Awards
 Won: Best Film
 Won: Best Director (Ann Hui)
 Won: Best Actor (Roy Chiao)
 Won: Best Actress (Josephine Siao)
 Won: Best Supporting Actor (Law Kar-Ying)
 Won: Best Screenplay (Chan Man-Keung)

32nd Golden Horse Awards
 Won: Best Film
 Won: Best Actress (Josephine Siao)
 Won: Best Supporting Actor (Law Kar-Ying)
 Won: Best Cinematography (Lee Pin-Bing)
 Nominated: Best Director (Ann Hui)

15th Hong Kong Film Awards
 Won: Best Film
 Won: Best Director (Ann Hui)
 Won: Best Actor (Roy Chiao)
 Won: Best Actress (Josephine Siao)
 Won: Best Supporting Actor (Law Kar-Ying)
 Won: Best Screenplay (Chan Man-Keung)
 Nominated: Best Art Direction (Wong Yank)
 Nominated: Best Film Editing (Wong Yee Shun)
 Nominated: Best New Performer (Allen Ting)
 Nominated: Best Supporting Actress (Law Koon-Lan)

2nd Hong Kong Film Critics Society Awards
 Won: Best Film
 Won: Best Actress (Josephine Siao)

See also
 List of submissions to the 68th Academy Awards for Best Foreign Language Film
 List of Hong Kong submissions for the Academy Award for Best Foreign Language Film

References

External links

 
 HK cinemagic entry

 

1995 films
Best Film HKFA
1990s Cantonese-language films
1995 comedy-drama films
Films directed by Ann Hui
Hong Kong comedy-drama films
1990s Hong Kong films